I'll Keep a Light On is the 11th studio album by singer Evelyn "Champagne" King. The album was released on Expansion Records.  It contains the single "I Think About You". Afterwards, King took a break from music until 2007's Open Book.

Track listing
 "Fascinated" - 5:34
 "I Think About You" - 5:08
 "I'll Keep a Light On" - 5:45
 "It Doesn't Really Matter" - 4:23
 "When It Comes Down to It" - 4:19
 "Sweet Funky Thing" - 4:40
 "A Lover I Can Love" - 4:39
 "Star Child" - 4:57
 "Love Is Love (All Over the World)" - 4:20
 "It's Not That Kind Of Party" - 4:48
 "In It for Me" - 4:22
 "Hold Tight" - 4:26
 "Shame '95" - 6:24

Personnel
 Rick Chudacoff - producer (1)
 Christopher Troy and Zach Harmon - producer (2, 5)
 Laney Stewart and Tony Hanes - producer (3, 7)
 Dennis Lambert - producer (4, 8)
 Tommy Faragher - producer (6)
 Reed Vertelney - producer (9)
 Preston Glass - producer (10)
 Michael Jay and Greg Lawson - producer (11)
 Charles Stewart and Thaddis Harrell - producer (12)
 John Fitch, Ruben Cross and T-Life - producer (13)

Singles
I Think About You

References

External links

1995 albums
Evelyn "Champagne" King albums